Sport Macúti e Benfica, is a football club from Beira, Mozambique, playing in the top division in Mozambican football, Moçambola.

Current squad 

Benfica